Colombia competed at the 2004 Summer Paralympics in Athens, Greece. The team included 5 athletes, four men and one woman, but won no medals.

Sports

Athletics

Men's track

Cycling

Men's road

Swimming

Men

Women

See also
Colombia at the Paralympics
Colombia at the 2004 Summer Olympics

References 

Nations at the 2004 Summer Paralympics
2004
Summer Paralympics